Eucithara debilis is a small sea snail, a marine gastropod mollusk in the family Mangeliidae.

Distribution
This marine species is found off Paumotus, Polynesia, and off Guam.

Description
The length of the shell attains 6 mm.

The shell is narrowly angulated at the suture, from which descend about ten longitudinal ribs, closely and finely crossed by revolving striae. Its color is white. The back of the body whorl is stained with chestnut.

References

External links
  Tucker, J.K. 2004 Catalog of recent and fossil turrids (Mollusca: Gastropoda). Zootaxa 682:1-1295
 Smith, Barry D. "Prosobranch gastropods of Guam." Micronesica 35.36 (2003): 244-270. 

debilis
Gastropods described in 1868